West of Zanzibar may refer to:

 West of Zanzibar (1928 film), an American silent film starring Lon Chaney
 West of Zanzibar (1954 film), a British adventure film featuring Anthony Steel